Bruno Guiblet (25 November 1951, Boulogne-Billancourt) is a French novelist. He grew up in Versailles, and now lives in Paris. His three novels which include the same characters intersect and extend.

Filmography 

  (1999), Meurtre au lavage, série TV
 La Vie moderne (2000) de Laurence Ferreira Barbosa

Novels 

L'Ignoble cosmonaute, 1998, NiL Éditions *
Le Muscle de l'amour, 2003, Robert Laffont
Se réveiller mort, 2011, Robert Laffont

References

External links 

Koboy

People from Boulogne-Billancourt
Living people
1951 births
French male writers
French male novelists
21st-century French novelists
21st-century French male writers